Hannie Lips (16 July 1924 – 19 November 2012) was a Dutch broadcaster and television announcer of among others Dutch public broadcasting association KRO.

She is best known to international audiences for presenting the Third Eurovision Song Contest in 1958 when it was staged in Hilversum, Netherlands. In addition she hosted the Dutch National Song Contest in 1960 and 1962.

Lips died in the Netherlands at the age of 88 in her hometown Laren.

References

External links

Dutch children's programmes

1924 births
2012 deaths
Dutch television actresses
Dutch television presenters
Dutch women television presenters
People from Laren, North Holland
Mass media people from Rotterdam
Radio and television announcers
Nationaal Songfestival presenters